Chinnachot Natasan (born 2 May 1982), simply known as his old name Wasan Natasan is a Thai former professional footballer. He was voted the best forward in the 2010 Thai Division 1 League. He was also Chiangrai's top goalscorer with 12 goals.

Club career

External links
 Profile at Goal

1982 births
Living people
Chinnachot Natasan
Chinnachot Natasan
Association football forwards
Chinnachot Natasan
Chinnachot Natasan
Chinnachot Natasan
Chinnachot Natasan
Chinnachot Natasan
Chinnachot Natasan
Chinnachot Natasan